was a town located in Yama District, Fukushima Prefecture, Japan.

As of 2003, the town had an estimated population of 10,457 and a density of 226.15 persons per km². The total area was 46.24 km².

On January 4, 2006, Shiokawa, along with the town of Yamato, and the villages of Atsushiokanō and Takasato (all from Yama District), was merged into the expanded city of Kitakata.

See also
Shiokawa Station

External links
Kitakata official website 

Dissolved municipalities of Fukushima Prefecture
Kitakata, Fukushima